Lycée Léonard de Vinci is a French senior high school/sixth form college in Melun, France.

The school includes a boarding facility .

In 2014 the Greta des métiers du tertiaire moved to the second floor of building C of this school.

References

External links
 Lycée Léonard de Vinci 

Lycées in Seine-et-Marne
Boarding schools in France